Doria's green snake (Ptyas doriae) is a species of snake in the family Colubridae. The species is endemic to Asia.

Etymology
The specific name, doriae, is in honor of Italian naturalist Giacomo Doria.

Geographic range
P. doriae is found in southwestern China (Yunnan), northeastern India (Assam), and northern Myanmar (Kachin Hills).

Habitat

Description
It is greenish dorsally, and whitish ventrally. The upper lip is also whitish. The dorsal scales are smooth, without apical pits, and arranged in 15 rows throughout the length of the body.

Behavior
P. doriae is diurnal and partly arboreal.

Reproduction
P. doriae is oviparous.

References

Further reading
Boulenger GA (1888). "An Account of the Reptilia obtained in Burma, north of Tenasserim, by M[onsieur]. L. Fea, of the Genova Civic Museum". Annali del Museo Civico di Storia Naturale di Genova, Serie Seconda 6 (26): 593-604 + Plates V-VII. (Cyclophiops doriae, new species, p. 599 + Plate VI, figures 1, 1a, 1b).
Boulenger GA (1890). The Fauna of British India, Including Ceylon and Burma. Reptilia and Batrachia. London: Secretary of State for India in Council. (Taylor and Francis, printers). xviii + 541 pp. (Ablabes doriæ, new combination, pp. 306–307).
Boulenger GA (1894). Catalogue of the Snakes in the British Museum (Natural History). Volume II., Containing the Conclusion of the Colubridæ Aglyphæ. London: Trustees of the British Museum (Natural History). (Taylor and Francis, printers). xi + 382 pp. + Plates I-XX. (Ablabes doriæ, pp. 279–280).
Sharma RC (2003). Handbook: Indian Snakes. Kolkata: Zoological Survey of India. 292 pp. . (Opheodrys doriae).

Colubrids
Reptiles of Myanmar
Reptiles of China
Reptiles of India
Fauna of Assam
Taxa named by George Albert Boulenger